MasterChef Malaysia is a cooking show like the other MasterChef shows in other countries, such as USA, Australia, New Zealand, Croatia, Greece, India, Sweden, Indonesia, and the United Kingdom. The show will be aired for the upcoming first season on Astro Ria.

Season 1 (2011)
MasterChef Malaysia Season 1 is officially on 22 October 2011 to 8 January 2012 at 9:00 pm in Astro Ria. The first season introduces the jury of Mohd Johari Edrus (Chef Jo), Zubir Bin Md. Zain (Chef Zubir), and Mohd Nadzri Redzuawan (Chef Riz) while Yahaya Hassan Bin (Chef Yahaya) and Priya Menon (Chef Priya) jointly operate a boot-camp of the screening participants from 40 people to 24 participants MasterChef. Guest chefs including Norman Musa also took part in the series with a Celebrity Challenge.

This season has been crowned Ezani Farhana Md Monoto, a dentist, as the first champion.

Top 24

Season 2 (2012)
Masterchef Malaysia Season 2 is, as of June 2012, in the audition stage and is now on air Every Saturday to Thursday from 7:30–8 PM(Audition episodes between 8 till 13 September 2012) and 9:00 to 10:00 PM starting 15 September 2012(Top 24 Contestants) until 1 December 2012(Final) on Astro Ria.

After Season One, Mohd Nadzri Redzuawan (Chef Riz) did not return and was replaced by Chef Adu Amran Hassan since MasterChef Selebriti Malaysia started. UK-based Chef Norman Musa also made a return to the series for one episode.

This season has crowned Izyan Hani binti Mohd Izham, a geologist, as the winner.

Top 24

Peti Saji Misteri: Peluang Kedua
For this season, the judges launched a mini comeback competition called 'Cabaran Peti Saji Misteri: Peluang Kedua'. It involves almost all participants who were eliminated in MasterChef Malaysia Season 2. After being eliminated, the contestant continued their journey as eliminee and the contestants in the running and judges would select one of them to return to the competition later. Along returned to the competition in episode 51 for having accumulated of the highest average score for his dish. However, Hafiz were given a second chance to also return to the competition.

Top 10 Finalist
Izyan Hani (Izyan) (25 years old) is from Kuala Lumpur. Izyan is a graduate in Geology from a university in Canada. She loves kayaking and has worked on an oil rig prior to joining the competition. Among her favourite dishes are 'mac and cheese with chicken' and 'chicken roulade'. Izyan was announced as the winner on 1 December 2012 after competing with Ah Hong and Along in the season finale.

Ngui Yeong Hong (Ah Hong) (29 years old) is from Sarawak. He was the only Tiong Hoa participant in the season. He was a native of Sarawak has lived in Cardiff, United Kingdom for 7 years. This makes Ah Hong able to cook western dishes well. Ah Hong recently resigned as an architect in a firm wanted to further his ambitions in the culinary field. Ah Hong is the most underdog contestant of the season and the underdogness won the judges heart. Ah Hong was announced as the runner up on 1 December 2012.

Muhd Fazrul Nizam (Along) (18 years old) is from Kuala Lumpur. He is a taekwondo player in school and has represented the school at the national level. This young man may be deemed versatility of being able to do variety of jobs such as mechanics and fishing, he is also able to handle a knife properly. Along learned a lot about cooking from his mother and considers his mother as an idol in the culinary field, he wanted to prove that men like him are also able to cook with a nice par with the women out there. He was eliminated on episode 23 and returned to the competition in episode 51 along with Hafiz for having accumulated of the highest average score for his dish. He made it to final and came in third place.

Etiqah Siti Noorashikeen (Etiqa) (24 years old) is from Sabah. She is a post-graduate in Geology from the University Malaysia Sabah and have experience of working on an oil rig for several months before deciding to stop working. Although genius in academic, Etiqa also interested in various other activities such as cooking, karaoke and ATV riding. Her cooking influence is Chef Wan. She survived till final but was eliminated and came in fourth place.

Nurul Shazlina (Nina) (31 years old) is from Kedah. Nina interested in the culinary field since childhood and began making and selling cookies when she was in high school. She is the most quiet, shy and very easy to tears especially when telling stories about her 11-month-old baby. Her cooking influence is her mother. She was eliminated on episode 70, and came in fifth place.

Kasila Paeng (Che' Lah) (40 years old) is from Johor Bahru. The mother of four children, is a contractor and beauty consultant beauty salons conducted in her own house. For Che 'Lah, age is not a barrier to active work and at the same time still look beautiful and elegant. Her personal cooking influence is herself. She is the strongest contender of the season. She was eliminated on episode 69, and came in sixth place.

Nora Ashikin (Nora) (26 years ols) is from Pahang. She is one of the Malaysian Rugby Union players. Nora has also served as an officer in a private college sports. Nora just starting to learn to cook seriously two years ago, through television and the internet. Her cooking influence is from internet . She was eliminated on episode 68, and came in seventh place.

Muhd Fizuan Syahnaz (Fizuan) (19 years old) is from Johor Bahru. He also has a very interesting personality, funny and charming. The most sad thing ever happened in his life was when he had to accept the fact that his mother had died when he was 18 years old. His cooking influence is his mother. Among the specialties are taught by his mother is 'Sambal Bunga Kantan'. He was eliminated on episode 67 and came in eighth place.

Ahmad Nuruddin (Dean) (24 years old) is from Kedah. Passion for cooking since childhood makes him so deeply ingrained in the culinary field. Among his favourite cuisine often gets praise is 'Asam Pedas'. His cooking influence is authentic Malay. He is the first recipient of judges save of the season together with Izyan, saving both from elimination. He was eliminated on episode 65 and came in ninth place.

Khairul Ammar (Ammar) (22 years old) is from Selangor. Among the dishes are always cooked and always get requests from friends and family is, 'Milk Butter Chicken'. His cooking influence is his mother. He was fan's favourite of the season and impressed people after surviving most elimination with injured hand. He was the 16th finalist eliminated on episode 62 and came in tenth place.

Ujian Penyingkiran

Elimination chart

References

External links
 http://www.astro.com.my/masterchefv2/indices/index_1570.html

Malaysian reality television series
Malaysia
2011 Malaysian television series debuts
2012 Malaysian television series endings
Non-British television series based on British television series